Gustaf Johannes Carlson (22 July 1894 – 12 August 1942) was a Swedish footballer who competed in the 1924 Summer Olympics. A defender, he was a member of the Swedish team which won the bronze medal in the football tournament.

References

External links
profile

1894 births
1942 deaths
Association football defenders
Swedish footballers
Sweden international footballers
Footballers at the 1924 Summer Olympics
Olympic footballers of Sweden
Olympic bronze medalists for Sweden
Medalists at the 1924 Summer Olympics
Olympic medalists in football
Swedish football managers
Sweden national football team managers
Footballers from Stockholm
19th-century Swedish people
20th-century Swedish people